The 1943 Argentine Film Critics Association Awards ceremony was held in Buenos Aires on 10 January 1943  to honour the best films and contributors to Argentine cinema in 1942. This was the first time the awards had been presented.

Awards given
Best Film  (Mejor Película): The Gaucho War (La guerra gaucha)
Best Director  (Mejor Director): Lucas Demare for The Gaucho War
Best Actor  (Mejor Actor): Arturo García Buhr for The Kids Grow Up (Los chicos crecen)
Best Actress  (Mejor Actriz): Amelia Bence for The Third Kiss (El tercer beso)
Best Original Screenplay (Mejor Guión Original): Hugo Mac Dougall for Malambo
Best Adapted Screenplay (Mejor Guión Adaptado): Ulises Petit de Murat and Homero Manzi for  The Gaucho War
Best Foreign Film (Mejor Película Extranjera): John Ford's How Green Was My Valley (1941)
Special Prize (Premio especial):  Dante Quinterno for his short animated colour film Upa en apuros

References

External links
1943 Argentinean Film Critics Association Awards at the Internet Movie Database

Argentine Film Critics Association Awards ceremonies
1943 in Argentina
1942 film awards